Molybdenum chloride can refer to:
Molybdenum(II) chloride (molybdenum dichloride), MoCl2
Molybdenum(III) chloride (molybdenum trichloride), MoCl3
Molybdenum(IV) chloride (molybdenum tetrachloride), MoCl4
Molybdenum(V) chloride (molybdenum pentachloride), MoCl5
Molybdenum(VI) chloride (molybdenum hexachloride), MoCl6